Blood in My Eye is the fifth studio album by American rapper Ja Rule, released on November 4, 2003, by Murder Inc. and Island Def Jam Music Group. The album was originally planned to be released as a mixtape. The release took place during the feud with Shady/Aftermath rappers 50 Cent, G-Unit, Eminem, D12, Dr. Dre, Obie Trice, along with artists including DMX and Busta Rhymes and was entirely dedicated to dissing them. The album was named after George Jackson's radical book of the same name. Hussein Fatal of Outlawz, Cadillac Tah, James Gotti, Sizzla, Black Child, Young Merc, D.O. Cannon, Shadow, and Sekou 720 are listed as guest appearances on this album. Reviews for the record were mixed, with critics skeptical of Ja's lyrical skills as a hardcore rapper. Blood in My Eye debuted at number 6 on the Billboard 200 chart, with first-week sales of 140,000 copies in the United States.

Critical reception 

Blood in My Eye garnered mixed reviews from music critics. At Metacritic, which assigns a normalized rating out of 100 to reviews from mainstream critics, the album received an average score of 45, based on 8 reviews.

Beccy Lindon of The Guardian called the record "a rough, back-to-basics rap album", noting that it is filled with guest verses from hardcore rappers and devoid of R&B artists, concluding that it is "more concerned with answering critics and continuing the backbiting with the Death Row camp." Jon Caramanica, writing for Rolling Stone, commended Ja for breaking away from his usual love duet formula to deliver shots at other rappers but said that "the boasts here feel utterly tired. And so does the attitude." Michael Endelman of Entertainment Weekly found the album to be "a dull slog with a dearth of hooks and a surfeit of gangsta clichés."

Steve 'Flash' Juon of RapReviews criticized the narrow-minded lyrical takedowns and suggested that Ja stick to mainstream R&B/hip-hop duets, despite crediting the production and collaborations with Hussein Fatal, saying that, "All things considered though, this short 45 minute album will not solve Ja's problems, nor will it restore him to chart dominance." AllMusic editor Jason Birchmeier called it "a very focused and heartfelt album", much more than his debut Venni Vetti Vecci, but felt that Ja worked better as a mainstream rapper crafting "catchy pop-rap tracks with grimy posturing and singalong hooks." He added that listeners would not get much out of the record, saying "there are only two quality songs, a lot of redundant trash-talking, and an overall sense of ridiculousness that pervades."

Track listing 
Credits adapted from the album's liner notes.

 (co.) Co-producer

Sample credits
 "The Crown" contains a sample of "Solid as a Rock", written by Miguel Collins and Bobby Dixon, performed by Sizzla.
 "Blood In My Eye" contains a sample of "Slippin' Into Darkness", written by Thomas Allen, Harold Brown, Morris Dickerson, Leroy Jordan, Lee Levitin, Charles Miller, and Howard Scott, performed by War.
 "The Wrap (Freestyle)" contains a sample of "Learning Burn", written by Albert Johnson, Kejuan Muchita, and Tajuan Perry, performed by Mobb Deep.

Charts

Weekly charts

Year-end charts

See also
 List of Billboard number-one R&B albums of 2003

References 

2003 albums
Ja Rule albums
Def Jam Recordings albums
Albums produced by Scott Storch
Albums produced by Irv Gotti